"I'm Grown" is the second single from Tiffany Evans' self-titled debut album, Tiffany Evans. The song was produced by Rodney Jerkins and features rapper Bow Wow.

Charts

References

2007 songs
2008 singles
Bow Wow (rapper) songs
Song recordings produced by Rodney Jerkins
Tiffany Evans songs
Songs written by Rodney Jerkins
Songs written by Bow Wow (rapper)
Songs written by Crystal Nicole